Seter is a village located along the Trondheimsfjord in the municipality of Indre Fosen in Trøndelag county, Norway.  The Norwegian County Road 755 connects it to the village of Vanvikan to the southwest and to the villages of Leksvik and Dalbygda to the northeast.

References

Villages in Trøndelag
Indre Fosen